Air Vice Marshal Sturley Philip Simpson,  (13 June 1896 – 28 April 1966) was a senior Royal Air Force commander.

RAF career
Simpson was commissioned into the Bedfordshire Regiment in 1915 during the First World War. Awarded the Military Cross in 1927, he was appointed Officer Commanding No. 4 Squadron in 1930 and Station Commander at RAF Thornaby in 1938. During the Second World War he commanded AHQ Gibraltar and then No. 18 Group. He retired in 1947.

After the Second World War Simpson was Commandant at Northolt Aerodrome.

References

1896 births
1966 deaths
Bedfordshire and Hertfordshire Regiment officers
British Army personnel of World War I
Companions of the Order of the Bath
Commanders of the Order of the British Empire
Grand Crosses of the Order of the White Lion
Recipients of the Military Cross
Royal Air Force air marshals of World War II
Royal Flying Corps officers